The Netherlands originally planned to participate in the Eurovision Song Contest 2020 with the song "Grow" written by Jeangu Macrooy and Pieter Perquin. The song was performed by Jeangu Macrooy, who was internally selected to represent the Netherlands at the 2020 contest. Macrooy's appointment as the Dutch representative was announced on 10 January 2020, while the song, "Grow", was presented to the public on 4 March 2020.

As the host country, the Netherlands automatically qualified to compete in the final of the Eurovision Song Contest. However, the contest was cancelled due to the COVID-19 pandemic.

Background
Following the introduction of semi-finals for the 2004 contest, the Netherlands had featured in seven finals. The Dutch least successful result has been last place, which they have achieved on five occasions, most recently in the second semi-final of the 2011 contest.

The Dutch national broadcaster, AVROTROS, broadcasts the event within the Netherlands and organises the selection process for the nation's entry. The Netherlands has used various methods to select the Dutch entry in the past, such as the Nationaal Songfestival, a live televised national final to choose the performer, song or both to compete at Eurovision. However, internal selections have also been held on occasion. Since 2013, the broadcaster has internally selected the Dutch entry for the contest. In 2013, the internal selection of Anouk performing "Birds" managed to take the country to the final for the first time in eight years and placed ninth overall. In 2014, the internal selection of the Common Linnets performing "Calm After the Storm" qualified the nation to the final once again and placed second, while the internal selection of Duncan Laurence in 2019 managed to achieve a Dutch victory for the first time since 1975. For 2020, the broadcaster opted to continue selecting the Dutch entry through an internal selection.

Before Eurovision

Internal selection 

Following Duncan Laurence's victory in 2019 with the song "Arcade", the Dutch broadcaster revealed in September 2019 that they would continue to internally select both the artist and song for the Eurovision Song Contest. A submission period was opened by the broadcaster on 17 October 2019 where artists and composers were able to submit their entries until 8 December 2019. Dutch media later rumoured that four entries had been shortlisted by AVROTROS and that their performers were singers Davina Michelle, Shirma Rouse, Thomas Berge and Jordan Roy.

On 9 January 2020, Dutch media reported that AVROTROS had selected Surinamese singer Jeangu Macrooy to represent the Netherlands at the 2020 contest. Jeangu Macrooy was confirmed as the Dutch entrant on 10 January 2020 during the NPO Radio 1 programme Humberto. The selection of Macrooy as the Dutch representative occurred through the decision of a selection commission consisting of AVROTROS general director Eric van Stade, television host and author Cornald Maas, singer and television host Jan Smit, radio DJs Coen Swijnenberg and Sander Lantinga, and Dutch Eurovision delegation member Joyce Hoedelmans. In regards to his selection as the Dutch entrant, Jeangu Macrooy stated: "I am indescribably honoured! It's a dream come true and the most beautiful thing that has come my way so far. My team and I are excited to make the Netherlands proud! Let's go!"

On 4 March 2020, Jeangu Macrooy's Eurovision entry, "Grow", was presented to the public through the release of the official music video, directed by Joe Roberts, via the official Eurovision Song Contest's YouTube channel. The song was written by Jeangu Macrooy himself together with Pieter Perquin. In regards to the song, Macrooy stated: "Emotions, good and bad, are a universal language. I hope this song makes people feel a little less lonely in their search for happiness. I think that openness and honesty about how we really feel will ultimately bring us closer. I believe in the power music has to bring people together. It's the reason I do what I do."

At Eurovision
According to Eurovision rules, all nations with the exceptions of the host country and the "Big Five" (France, Germany, Italy, Spain and the United Kingdom) are required to qualify from one of two semi-finals in order to compete for the final; the top ten countries from each semi-final progress to the final. As the host country, the Netherlands automatically qualified to compete in the final on 16 May 2020. In addition to their participation in the final, the Netherlands is also required to broadcast and vote in one of the two semi-finals. During the semi-final allocation draw on 28 January 2020, the Netherlands was assigned to broadcast and vote in the first semi-final on 12 May 2020. However, due to the COVID-19 pandemic, the contest was cancelled. The European Broadcasting Union (EBU) later confirmed that the Netherlands would remain as the host country of the 2021 contest.

As the host nation, the Netherlands' running order position in the final was decided through a random draw that took place during the Heads of Delegation meeting in Rotterdam on 9 March 2020. The Netherlands was set to perform in position 23.

References

External links

 Official AVROTROS Eurovision site

2020
Countries in the Eurovision Song Contest 2020
Eurovision